Cayucos Elementary School District is a public school district based inside San Luis Obispo County, California.

References

External links
 

School districts in San Luis Obispo County, California